All Pakistan Muslim League (APML) is a political party in Pakistan that was founded by Pervez Musharraf in 2010. The launching ceremony of the party was held in London, but the central secretariat of APML is located in Islamabad, Pakistan.

History 
The party was founded in 2010, and was named after the historical political party of Muslims in British India called the All India Muslim League, which has been credited with gaining independence for Pakistan from British India.

Electoral history

National Assembly elections

References

External links

2010 establishments in the United Kingdom
Islamic political parties in Pakistan
Muslim League breakaway groups
Pervez Musharraf
Political parties established in 2010
Political parties in Pakistan